The Thinking Schools Academy Trust is a multi-academy trust serving a family of schools mainly in the Medway authority.

The Trust bases its philosophy on the work of Bob Burden and the University of Exeter Postgraduate School of Education. The schools teaching and learning is based on cognitive development and sees its duty as teaching children how to think rather than memorising content.

Thinking tools 
Children are taught to discuss their learning, this is done by using Thinking Tools and Strategies. These include:
Thinking Maps
Thinking Hats
Thinkers’ Keys
Habits of Mind 
CoRT Thinking Tools
 Q-matrix
 SMART targeting
 Growth mindsets
 Philosophy for Children

Accreditation 
It is an objective of the trust that all its schools will receive Thinking School accreditation.
It is a whole school process that starts with the planning:
Thinking Skills
Reflectional Questioning
Visual Mapping
Collaborative Networking
Developing Dispositions
Structuring the Environment

Associated Schools
These schools are all in the Thinking Schools Academy Trust:

Secondary
Goodwin Academy, Deal
Holcombe Grammar School, Chatham
Plymouth High School for Girls
The Portsmouth Academy
The Rochester Grammar School
The Victory Academy, Chatham

Primary
All Faiths Children's Academy, Strood
Cedar Children's Academy
The Gordon Children's Academy, Strood
Isambard Brunel Junior School
Meon Infant School
Meon Junior School
Moorings Way Infant School
New Horizons Children's Academy
Newbridge Junior School

Other
New Horizons Teaching School Alliance
Thinking Fitness

Academies under construction
Maritime Academy, Strood: After many delays, the school is projected to open in 2022. The site off Parsonage Lane and Berwick Way, Strood was purchased in 2020, after Medway Council unwrote the costs of overage. The construction consists of an all-through school with a 1150 place secondary school and sixth form with sports hall, parking, playing fields and hard-surfaced courts.

The Grade I listed Manor Farm Barn will be extended to provide a wedding/conference facility. Conversion and extension of a former cattle barn will provide overnight accommodation.

Management issues
In April 2016 the Chief Executive Officer of the Thinking Schools Academy Trust, Rochester Grammar School's former headteacher,  Denise Shepherd was suspended due to allegations of snooping on staff emails, bullying staff and doctoring parts of an external inspection report. Shepherd has since resigned.

References

External links

Thinking Schools Trust official website

Multi-academy trusts